The 1955 San Diego State Aztecs football team represented San Diego State College during the 1955 college football season.

San Diego State competed in the California Collegiate Athletic Association (CCAA). The team was led by ninth-year head coach Bill Schutte, and played home games at both Aztec Bowl and Balboa Stadium. They finished the season with two and eight losses (2–8, 0–2 CCAA). The Aztecs were shutout three times, and a touchdown or less in 8 of 10 games. Overall, the team was outscored 65–231 for the season.

Schedule

Team players in the NFL
No San Diego State players were selected in the 1956 NFL Draft.

Notes

References

San Diego State
San Diego State Aztecs football seasons
San Diego State Aztecs football